Como is a city and comune of Lombardy, in Italy.

Como, CoMo or COMO may also refer to:

Places

Australia
Como, Queensland, a locality in Noosa Shire
Como, Western Australia
Como, New South Wales, a suburb of Sydney

Italy
Lake Como 
Province of Como

United States
Como, Colorado
Como, Indiana
Como, Minneapolis, Minnesota
Como, Mississippi
Como, Missouri, an unincorporated community
Como, Nevada, a ghost town in Nevada
Como, North Carolina
Como, Tennessee
Como, Texas
Como, Fort Worth, Texas, a neighborhood
Como, Wisconsin
Como Bluff, Wyoming, a famous dinosaur locality
Como Township, Marshall County, Minnesota
"CoMO", a nickname for the city of Columbia, Missouri

Other uses
Como (surname)
Calcio Como, an Italian football club
Isuzu Como, a Japanese concept car
 A mobile development platform by Conduit

See also
Comeaux
Komo (disambiguation)